George Crichton may refer to:
 George Crichton (bishop), keeper of the Privy Seal of Scotland and bishop of Dunkeld
 George Crichton, 1st Earl of Caithness, Lord High Admiral of Scotland
 Sir George Crichton (courtier), English courtier and Army officer